Roshini is an Indian playback singer who originally hails from Tamil Nadu. She has sung songs in Tamil and Telugu languages. She contested in the seventh season of Tamil reality show Super Singer in Vijay TV.

Guinness Record
Roshini along with her sister Anita (aka Singer Shalini JKA) performed the feat of 'singing non-stop for 37 hours', which fetched them a place in the Guinness Book of World Records.

Songs

References

External links
Hindu.com
Roshini in Super singer
Cinefolks.com
Nilacharal.com
Lakshmansruthi.com

Year of birth missing (living people)
Living people
Indian women playback singers
Malayalam playback singers
Tamil playback singers
Telugu playback singers
Musicians from Tiruchirappalli
Women musicians from Tamil Nadu
Singers from Tamaulipas
21st-century Indian singers
21st-century Indian women singers